The Bloomberg speech was an address on Britain's membership of the European Union, given in January 2013 by the then (Conservative Party) Prime Minister of the United Kingdom, David Cameron. Although presented while the Conservative-Liberal Democrat Coalition Government was in office, it was given as a party political speech rather than one given on behalf of the UK Government, without the support of the Liberal Democrats.

This was the first major Eurosceptic speech to be given by a serving Prime Minister since Margaret Thatcher's Bruges speech in 1988, and would mark the beginning of a series of events starting with the 2015–2016 United Kingdom renegotiation of European Union membership that would ultimately lead to the United Kingdom leaving the European Union seven years later in 2020, thereby ending 47 years of EU membership.

Composition
The speech was drafted by Edward Llewellyn, the Downing Street Chief of Staff, along with John Casson, Tim Kiddell and Helen Bower, with the opening few pages written by Clare Foges.

Content

The speech on 23 January 2013 at Bloomberg London covered the UK's future relationship with Europe. The Prime Minister called for fundamental reform of the European Union and called for an in–out referendum to be held on the UK's membership:

Outcome

Initially the speech had little impact politically as at the time polls were suggesting that the subsequent general election would result in a   'hung parliament'. With both Labour and the Liberal Democrats being opposed to an 'in/out' referendum, it was expected that the Conservatives would ultimately have to renege on any promise to hold a referendum if they were to remain in government. The Conservative Party included the referendum in their manifesto for the 2015 general election. Support for the UK Independence Party dropped substantially and the Conservatives won a unexpected small overall majority: the referendum was held in June 2016.

See also
2015–2016 United Kingdom renegotiation of European Union membership
2016 United Kingdom European Union membership referendum

References

David Cameron
Brexit
2013 in the United Kingdom
2013 speeches